Barate, Barata (Βάρατα), or Baratta (Βάραττα), was a town of ancient Lycaonia, on the road from Iconium to Tyana, 50 M.P. from the former. In some itineraria the name is also spelt Barathra. It was inhabited during Roman and Byzantine times.

Its site is tentatively located near Kızılkale, Karaman, Karaman Province, Turkey.

Barata is a titular bishopric of the Catholic Church.

References

Populated places in ancient Lycaonia
Former populated places in Turkey
Roman towns and cities in Turkey
Populated places of the Byzantine Empire
History of Karaman Province